Henry Bradley (1845–1923) was a British philologist and editor of the Oxford English Dictionary.

Henry Bradley may also refer to:

 Henry Bradley (MP), in 1421 MP for Old Sarum
 Henry Roswell Bradley (1832–1870), American politician
 Henry Houghton Burton Bradley (1845–1918), Australian arachnologist
 Henry D. Bradley (1893–1973), American newspaper publisher
 Henry Bradley (American football) (born 1953), American football defensive tackle

See also
 Henry Bradley Plant (1819–1899), Florida railroad investor 
 Harry Bradley (disambiguation)